John Tracy, 1st Viscount Tracy (died 1648) was an English landowner and politician who sat in the House of Commons from 1597.

Tracy was the son and heir of Sir John Tracy (died 1591), who was High Sheriff of Gloucestershire in 1578, and his wife Anne (died 1581), daughter of Thomas Throckmorton (died 1568).

He was admitted to the Inner Temple in November 1580, and granted special livery of his father's estates on 14 February 1592. In 1597, he was elected Member of Parliament for Gloucestershire.

He was probably knighted by James I on 23 July 1603. A younger brother, Thomas Tracy was an usher to Anne of Denmark. In 1609, John Tracy was High Sheriff of Gloucestershire. He was created Viscount Tracy, of Rathcoole in the County of Dublin, a title in the Peerage of Ireland, on 12 January 1643, being then "72 years old or more"..

Tracy died in or before 1648 when the administration was given of his estates.

Marriage and family
Tracy married Anne Shirley, daughter of Sir Thomas Shirley of Wiston, Sussex in about 1590. Their children included:
 Robert Tracy, 2nd Viscount Tracy, who married (1) Bridget Lyttleton, (2) Dorothy Cocks
 John Tracy of Stanhow, Norfolk, who married Elizabeth Allington, widow of Henry Palavicini (a son of Horatio Palavicino) and William Clopton

References

Year of birth missing
1648 deaths
English MPs 1597–1598
Members of the Inner Temple
High Sheriffs of Gloucestershire
16th-century births
17th-century English people
Politicians from Gloucestershire
Viscounts in the Peerage of Ireland
Peers of Ireland created by Charles I